Piggy bank (sometimes penny bank or money box) is the traditional name of a coin container normally used by children. The piggy bank is known to collectors as a "still bank" as opposed to the "mechanical banks" popular in the early 20th century. These items are also often used by companies for promotional purposes. The use of the name 'piggy bank' gave rise to its widely recognized 'pig' shape, and many financial service companies use piggy banks as logos for their savings products.

Piggy banks are usually made of ceramic or porcelain. They are generally painted and serve as a pedagogical device to teach the rudiments of thrift and saving to children; money can be easily inserted. Many piggy banks have a rubber plug located on the underside; others are made of vinyl and have a removable nose for easy coin access. Some incorporate electronic systems which calculate the amount of money deposited. Some piggy banks do not have an opening besides the slot for inserting coins, which will lead to smashing the piggy bank with a hammer or by other means, to obtain the money within.

Origins

The oldest Western find of a money box dates from 2nd century BC Greek colony Priene, Asia Minor, and features the shape of a miniature Greek temple with a slit in the pediment. Money boxes of various forms were also excavated in Pompeii and Herculaneum, and appear quite frequently on late ancient provincial sites, particularly in Roman Britain and along the Rhine.

Pig-shaped money box

The earliest known pig-shaped money containers date to the 12th century on the island of Java. The Javanese term cèlèngan (ꦕꦺꦭꦺꦁꦔꦤ꧀; literally "likeness of a wild boar", but used to mean both "savings" and "piggy bank") is also in the modern Indonesian language. 

A large number of boar-shaped piggy banks were discovered at the large archaeological site surrounding Trowulan, a village in the Indonesian province of East Java and possible site of the capital of the Majapahit Empire.

There are a number of folk etymologies regarding the English language term "piggy bank," but in fact, there is no clear origin for the phrase. The earliest citation in the Oxford English Dictionary is from 1913, and from 1902 for the variant "pig bank". It is believed that the popularity of the Western piggy banks originates in Germany, where pigs were revered as symbols of good fortune. The oldest German piggy bank dates to the 13th century and was recovered during construction work in Thuringia. The earliest known use of "pig bank" in English is the 1903 book An American Girl in Mexico, which describes them as a Mexican souvenir. In Mexico, piggy banks are called alcancía, a term originating from Andalusian Arabic.

Uses 
The general use of piggy banks is to store loose change in a quaint, decorative manner. Modern piggy banks are not limited to the likeness of pigs, and may come in a range of shapes, sizes and colors. They are most commonly used by temples and churches because they are locked money boxes with a narrow opening to drop cash or coins. The box is opened via a plug underneath it at regular intervals, when the collected money is counted and recorded.

See also

 Maneki-neko
 Tudor money box

Image gallery

Notes

References

External links

 What's the origin of the piggy bank? (from The Straight Dope)

Money containers
Banks
Coins
Figurines
Traditional toys
Pigs in art

da:Sparebøsse#Sparegris